Ma Shuai may refer to:
 Ma Shuai (footballer, born 1985)
 Ma Shuai (footballer, born 1998)